Gorenja Vas is a small settlement just north of Dobrnič in the Municipality of Trebnje in eastern Slovenia. The area is part of the historical region of Lower Carniola. The municipality is now included in the Southeast Slovenia Statistical Region.

References

External links
Gorenja Vas at Geopedia

Populated places in the Municipality of Trebnje